Halinga was a municipality located in Pärnu County, one of the 15 counties of Estonia.

Settlements
Borough
Pärnu-Jaagupi
Villages
Aasa, Altküla, Anelema, Arase, Eametsa, Eense, Eerma, Enge, Ertsma, Halinga, Helenurme, Kablima, Kaelase, Kangru, Kodesmaa, Kuninga, Langerma, Lehtmetsa, Lehu, Libatse, Loomse, Maima, Mõisaküla, Mäeküla, Naartse, Oese, Pallika, Pereküla, Pitsalu, Pööravere, Roodi, Rukkiküla, Salu, Sepaküla, Sõõrike, Soosalu, Tarva, Tõrdu, Tühjasma, Vahenurme, Vakalepa, Valistre, Vee.

References